Uelzen is a railway station located in Uelzen, Germany, at the eastern edge of the Lüneburg Heath Nature Park. The station is located on the Hannover–Hamburg railway, Uelzen–Langwedel railway, Stendal–Uelzen railway and Brunswick–Uelzen railway. The train services are operated by Deutsche Bahn, Metronom and Erixx.

The original station was renovated for Expo 2000 following plans by the Austrian artist and architect Friedensreich Hundertwasser.  As an "environmentally culturally oriented" station, the Uelzen station is now marketed as the Hundertwasser-Bahnhof Uelzen (Hundertwasser Station, Uelzen). Today it is one of the town's popular tourist attractions.

History
After 1847, the stretch of the Royal Hanoverian State Railways's line between Hamburg and Hanover was modified, coursing from Hanover to Celle, then through Uelzen, finally arriving at the Hamburg-Harburg station.  Due to this modification, the Uelzen station was built.  The original temporary entrance hall was later replaced with a truss structure. When the number of travelers continued to increase, a new Tudor-style Hanoverian station was built.

After the annexation of the Kingdom of Hanover by Prussia in 1866 during the Austro-Prussian War, the America Line was opened in 1873, a direct connection between Berlin, the capital, and the naval fleet at Wilhelmshaven.  Three railway companies took part in the construction of the Uelzen station.  In 1888 the station was once again renovated, this time in Wilhelmian style.

In 1900, the Brunswick–Uelzen railway was opened, which connects Wieren to Brunswick by way of Uelzen and Gifhorn.  In 1924, the Uelzen–Dannenberg railway was built, although later put out of service in 1975.  After the Second World War, the America Line between Bergen an der Dumme and Salzwedel was decommissioned.  Later, the use of the section between Wieren and Nienbergen was discontinued, before the section to Salzwedel returned to use after German reunification.

Train services
The following services currently call at the station:

Until mid-December 2014 the station was also served by EuroCity "Wawel", which used to run once daily between Hamburg Altona and Wrocław Główny six days a week.

Expo 2000

After the station was heavily damaged as a result of the Second World War and various additions and renovations, the station lost its original structural style.  In the mid-1990s, an improved renovation was conceptualized. The main focus was to change the station to be "environmentally and culturally oriented".  The first step of the redesign, completed in 1997, was to install photovoltaic cells on the roof of the station.  Further additions included the removal of the unused tracks and rail yard areas.

On December 16, 1999, the developmental concept put forth by Bahnhof Uelzen e.V. was publicized for the worldwide Expo 2000.  In addition to various local authorities, the project was supported by the Deutsche Bahn.  The focus of the project was the transformation of the building and the platforms following the plans of the Viennese architect Friedensreich Hundertwasser.

On November 25, 2000, the new station was ceremoniously dedicated.  Since then, it has become a tourist attraction and welcomes over 450,000 visitors every year.  As part of the "Niedersachsen ist am Zug!" ("It’s Lower Saxony’s Turn / Lower Saxony Rides the Train!") developmental program promoted by the federal government and Lower Saxony between 2006 and 2007, the station was modernized at a price of €5 million.  Through this modernization, all platforms were brought up to code and outfitted with provisions for physically disabled  patrons.  Furthermore, unfinished details from Hundertwasser's original design were realized.

References

External links
Station Website (in German)

Railway stations in Lower Saxony
Modernist architecture in Germany
Expressionist architecture
Visionary environments
Uelzen (district)
Railway stations in Germany opened in 1847